Yelatan is a village in Çamardı district of Niğde Province, Turkey. It is situated in the Taurus Mountains. The village is at the south of Çamardı. The population of the village is  1027.  as of 2011.

References

Çamardı towns and villages